Talent 09 is the second series of the Danish adaption of the program format Got Talent. The first season was named Talent 08.

The show and the price of 250.000 DKK was won by Kalle Pimp.

Judges 
Jesper Dahl
Hella Joof
Nikolaj Koppel

Crew 
Executive producer: Henrik Hancke Nielsen
Producer: Ask Greiffenberg
Producer: Thomas Meyer

Danish reality television series
2000s Danish television series
2009 Danish television series debuts
Danish-language television shows